Corella  is a town and municipality located in the province and autonomous community of Navarre, northern Spain. It is located 91.5 km from Pamplona, and is on the River Alhama, a tributary of the Ebro River. The population in 2022 was 8,336 inhabitants. Corella is the second most populated municipality in Ribera , southern part of Navarre. Corella is well known for its wine.

Corella was the birthplace of composer Blas de Laserna.

References

External links
 CORELLA in the Bernardo Estornés Lasa - Auñamendi Encyclopedia (Euskomedia Fundazioa) 

Municipalities in Navarre